
Gmina Miedzichowo is a rural gmina (administrative district) in Nowy Tomyśl County, Greater Poland Voivodeship, in west-central Poland.

The gmina contains part of the protected area called Pszczew Landscape Park.

Villages
Gmina Miedzichowo contains the villages and settlements of Błaki, Bolewice, Bolewicko, Grudna, Jabłonka Stara, Łęczno, Lewiczynek, Lubień, Miedzichowo, Nowa Silna, Pąchy, Piotry, Prądówka, Sępolno, Stary Folwark, Szklarka Trzcielska, Toczeń, Trzciel-Odbudowa, Węgielnia, Zachodzko and Zawada.

Neighbouring gminas
Gmina Miedzichowo is bordered by the gminas of Lwówek, Międzychód, Nowy Tomyśl, Pszczew, Trzciel and Zbąszyń.

References

External links
Polish official population figures 2006

Miedzichowo
Nowy Tomyśl County